The 1911 United States Senate election in Massachusetts was held during January 1911. Republican incumbent Henry Cabot Lodge won election to a fourth term despite intense opposition within his own party. Lodge received only five votes more than the necessary minimum for a majority.

At the time, Massachusetts elected United States senators by a majority vote of the combined houses of the Massachusetts General Court.

Background
Lodge faced opposition from Progressive Republicans over his alleged support of big business and trade restrictions, as well as his "bossism" and opposition to popular election of Senators. The opposition was led by U.S. Representative Butler Ames, who declared his candidacy against Lodge on June 26, 1910.

Following the 1910 state election, the incoming Massachusetts Senate was composed of 25 Republicans and 15 Democrats. The Massachusetts House of Representatives was composed of 128 Republicans, 111 Democrats, and one Socialist. The overall composition of the General Court was 153 Republicans, 126 Democrats, and one Socialist.

Polling
In a November 10 canvas of Republican state legislators-elect, the Daily Globe found 51 in favor of Lodge's re-election, 12 opposed, and 50 uncommitted. 40 did not respond.

In a November 23 canvas of Republican state legislators-elect, the Daily Globe found 62 in favor of Lodge's re-election, 14 opposed, and 64 uncommitted. 13 did not respond.

Results

References

1911
Massachusetts
United States Senate